"Strangers" is a song by American producer Seven Lions and Hungarian electronic music duo Myon & Shane 54 featuring vocals from Swedish singer-songwriter Tove Lo. American record label Republic Records released the song as part of the soundtrack for The Mortal Instruments: City of Bones on August 20, 2013. American record label Casablanca Records released it as a single on October 11, 2013. The song is the fourth track on Seven Lions' 2014 EP, Worlds Apart.

Reception and release
Billboard called the song "a bright and swift tour-de-EDM-force with a touch of ethereal fantasy that owes a sense of agitation equally to 'Scary Monsters, Nice Sprites' and angsty teenage dreams." Vice Media called the 2014 re-release "more epic and lush" than the original. Complex used the term "trancestep" to describe the song, noting its mixture of dubstep, trance, and electro house, finalising their review by writing that the song "makes for an emotive concoction that not only leaves you inspired but transports you to a new world."

"Strangers" was ranked 9th on Buzzfeed's Top 25 Dance Records of 2013. In 2016, the song was listed as one of EDM Sauce's 59 Happiest EDM Songs.

On August 20, 2013, the song was released as a digital download on international digital stores through Republic Records and Casablanca Records, as well as being released through various music streaming services.

Track listing

Charts

Weekly charts

Year-end charts

Release history

References

2013 singles
2013 songs
Dubstep songs
Electronic songs
Progressive house songs
Seven Lions songs
Songs written by Tove Lo
Tove Lo songs